VAPCO Manufacturing CO. Ltd. is a company based in Amman, Jordan, that produces veterinary and agrochemical products.  It was established in 1975.

External links
VAPCO Website

Companies based in Amman
Veterinary medicine companies
Companies established in 1975